Levan Razmadze (born 14 November 1985) is a Georgian judoka and mixed martial artist who competes in the super heavyweight division. Razmadze is a member of the Georgian Olympic Judo team. He is the current DEEP Megaton Champion. He is also widely known in Japan as どすこい羅頭魔勢, the combination of his nickname Dosukoi and an ateji for his family name.

Judo career
Razmadze was active in various levels in Judo competition from 2003 to 2008, winning the 2004 European U20 Championship in Sofia and 2007 Super World Cup in Moscow at Half-heavyweight (-100 kg). He was an alternate for the Republic of Georgia at the 2008 Summer Olympics.

He holds wins over Olympic bronze medalists Dimitri Peters and Movlud Miraliyev, World Championships silver metalists Peter Cousins and Vitaly Bubon, and Pan American gold medalist Mário Sabino.

Achievements

Mixed martial arts career

Early career
Razmadze made his MMA debut against Hee Seok Song at Gladiator 13 on January 30, 2011, Winning the bout via TKO in the first round.

DEEP
Razmadze made his DEEP debut against Ryota Ryota at Deep - clubDeep in Diana, Razmadze defeated Ryota via Submission (armbar) in the first round. In his second fight with the DEEP promotion Razmadze faced Seigo Mizuguchi at Deep - 54 Impact and won the bout via TKO (punches) in the first round.

Razmadze faced Kazuhisa Tazawa for the DEEP Megaton Championship at Deep - 55 Impact and won the bout via Submission (keylock) in the first round.

Razmadze faced Ryuta Noji in his first title defense at Deep - 57 Impact and won the bout via Submission (armbar) in the first round. Razmadze later vacated the Deep Megaton Championship. After 3 years on the sidelines Razmadze returned to face Arsen Abdulkerimov at M-1 Challenge 55 - In Memory of Guram Gugenishvili and lost via Submission (armbar) in the first round.

Championships and accomplishments
DEEP
DEEP Megaton Championship (One time)

Mixed martial arts record

|-
| Loss
| align=center| 5–1
| Arsen Abdulkerimov
| Submission (armbar) 
| M-1 Challenge 55 - In Memory of Guram Gugenishvili
| 
| align=center| 1
| align=center| 3:58
| Tbilisi, Georgia
| 
|-
| Win
| align=center| 5–0
| Ryuta Noji  
| Submission (armbar) 
| Deep - 57 Impact 
| 
| align=center| 1
| align=center| 3:16
| Tokyo, Japan
| Defended DEEP Megaton Championship 
|-
| Win
| align=center| 4–0
| Kazuhisa Tazawa  
| Submission (keylock) 
| Deep: 55 Impact
| 
| align=center| 1
| align=center| 1:29
| Tokyo, Japan
| Won DEEP Megaton Championship 
|-
| Win
| align=center| 3–0
| Seigo Mizuguchi  
| TKO (punches)
| Deep: 54 Impact
| 
| align=center| 1
| align=center| 3:21
| Tokyo, Japan
| 
|-
| Win
| align=center| 2–0
| Ryota Ryota
| Submission (armbar)
| Deep: clubDeep in Diana
| 
| align=center| 1
| align=center| 0:56
| Tokyo, Japan
| 
|-
| Win
| align=center| 1–0
| Hee Seok Song  
| TKO (corner stoppage)
| Gladiator 13
| 
| align=center| 1
| align=center| 4:23
| Tokyo, Japan
|

References

External links
 

1985 births
Expatriate sportspeople from Georgia (country) in Japan
Male judoka from Georgia (country)
Living people
Male mixed martial artists from Georgia (country)
Super heavyweight mixed martial artists
Mixed martial artists utilizing judo
Deep (mixed martial arts) champions